Peltandreae is a tribe of plants in the arum family.

Distribution
The distribution is disjunct. Peltandra is native to Eastern North America and the Caribbean (Canada, USA, Cuba) and Typhonodorum is native to Africa (the Comoros, Madagascar, Mauritius, Tanzania).

Taxonomy

Taxonomic history
The tribe was first described in 1876 by the German botanist Heinrich Gustav Adolf Engler (Engl.). Engler placed Typhonodorum in a separate tribe Typhonodoreae. However, it is now included in Peltandreae.

Genera
Peltandreae consists of the following two genera:
Peltandra Raf.
Typhonodorum Schott

Phylogeny
It is closely related to the European tribes Ambrosineae and Arisareae. These three tribes shared a common ancestor about 82.7 million years ago. 60 Million years old Peltandreae fossils have been found in Europe, North America, and Central Asia. Therefore, the group has existed for at least 60 Million years, as the evidence of the fossil record suggests, but the analysis of the molecular clock suggests this group is about 82.7 million years old.

The precise relationships are displayed in the following cladogram:

References 

Aroideae
Monocot tribes